Jan-Paul Brekke (born 19 March 1966) is a Norwegian sociologist and comedian. He currently works as a senior researcher at the Norwegian Institute for Social Research. His fields of research are migration and refugees, and sociology of sport. Since 2003, he has also been a regular panel member on the nationally broadcast TV show Løvebakken. He is a member of the comedy troupe Teatersport Oslo, together with Harald Eia, Helen Vikstvedt and Torbjørn Harr. They won the Norwegian championship in Theatresports in 1994.

Personal life
Brekke is married to Tine Mørch Smith, who since 2010 has been Deputy Permanent Representative of Norway to the United Nations in New York. They have three children.

Publications
2010 Life on Hold 
2009 (with  Monica Five Aarset). Why Norway?: Understanding Asylum Destinations. Oslo: Institute for Social Research,
2007 Reception Conditions for Asylum Seekers in Norway and the EU. Oslo: Institute for Social Research, 2007. 
2007 (with Tordis Borchgrevink) Talking about integration : discources, alliances and theories on labour market integration in Sweden
2006 International students and immigration to Norway
2006 Utestengt fra velferdsstaten
2005 Humanitet eller null-tolerans
2004 While We Are Waiting: Uncertainty and Empowerment Among Asylum-Seekers in Sweden. Oslo, Norway: Institute for Social Research, .
2004 The Struggle for Control: The Impact of National Control Policies on the Arrival of Asylum Seekers to Scandinavia 1999-2004. Oslo, Norway: Institute for Social Research, 
2002 Samtalekulturen i diplomatiet
2002 Children and Adolescents with an Immigrant Background: An Overview of Nordic Research. Kbh: Nordic Council of Ministers, .
2002 Kosovo-Norge, tur og retur : midlertidig opphold for kosovoflyktninger Oslo : Institutt for samfunnsforskning, 
2001 Velkommen og farvel?  : midlertidig beskyttelse for flyktninger i Norge. [Oslo]: Institutt for samfunnsforskning,   
2001 "The Dilemmas of Temporary Protection – the Norwegian Experience" in Policy Studies, 22, no. 1 (2001): 5-18
1999 Midlertidig beskyttelse i Nordisk flyktningepolitikk1999Barn og unge med innvandrerbakgrunn : en nordisk kunnskapsoversikt Kbh. : Nordisk Ministerråd, 
1999 Barn og ungdoms levekår i Norden: en nordisk kunnskapsoversikt1998 Et nytt flyktningregime? : om midlertidig beskyttelse i Norge1995 Ansvar for andre : frivillighetssentralen i velferdspolitikken 1994 Frivillighet og lokalsamfunn : En studie av to frivillighetssentralers omgivelser.''

References

Living people
Norwegian sociologists
1966 births